The Petrolia Jets were a junior ice hockey team based in Petrolia, Ontario, Canada.  They played in the Western division of the Greater Ontario Junior Hockey League, the Western Ontario Hockey League, and the Great Lakes Junior C Hockey League.

History
During the 1960s, the Petrolia Jets participated in a loosely ran Bluewater League that was sometimes classified as a junior league depending on how competitive its teams felt.  From 1967, the Jets were permanently a junior hockey club.  In 1968 and 1969 made it to the league final, but failed to win.  Starting in the 1970, the Jets would win the regional Junior B championship and play for the OHA Sutherland Cup championship.

In 1972, the Great Lakes Junior C Hockey League would revert permanently to Junior C hockey, and the Jets jumped to the more broad and competitive Western Ontario Junior B Hockey League.  The Jets would not enjoy much success in the WOHL and returned to the GLJHL in 1984.  Despite five great regular seasons in Junior C, the Jets would never even make the GLJHL final and returned to the WOHL in 1989.

Despite winning the WOHL regular season crown in 1995 and the league's playoff title in 2003, the Jets success in the box office dwindled over the years.  In the late 2000s on-ice success disappeared, and the team was moved to Forest, Ontario and renamed the Lambton Shores Predators because of competition for fans from the neighbouring Sarnia Sting

Season-by-season results

Notable alumni
Todd Bidner
Scott Foster
Bobby Gould
Tim Hrynewich
Dale Hunter
Mark Hunter
Michael Leighton
John Van Boxmeer
Pat Verbeek
Paul Ysebaert
Steve Mason
Brian Campbell
matt the flash danbrook

External links
GOJHL Webpage

Western Junior B Hockey League teams